Joe McComb is an American businessman and politician who served as the mayor of Corpus Christi, Texas from 2017 to 2021. McComb had previously served on the city council and as a Nueces County Commissioner. Prior to entering politics, McComb had run his moving business. He is a member of the Republican Party. After Dan McQueen's resignation, McComb was elected to serve out the remainder of his term in a special election. He was elected to serve a full two-year term in the 2018 Corpus Christi mayoral election.

References

Living people
1947 births
21st-century American politicians
Texas Republicans
Mayors of Corpus Christi, Texas
Del Mar College alumni
Stephen F. Austin State University alumni